Yanzhuang may refer to the following locations in China:

Towns
 Yanzhuang, Henan (闫庄镇), in Song County
 Yanzhuang, Ju County (阎庄镇), Shandong
 Yanzhuang, Yuanping (闫庄镇), Shanxi
 Yanzhuang, Tianjin (沿庄镇), in Jinghai District, Tianjin
 Yanzhuang, Jinan (颜庄镇), in Gangcheng District, Jinan, Shandong

Townships
 Yanzhuang Township, Hebei (阎庄乡), in Qingyuan District, Baoding, Hebei
 Yanzhuang Township, Shanxi (闫庄镇), in Xiyang County

Subdistrict
 Yanzhuang Subdistrict (烟庄街道), Guan County, Shandong